Rasmus Falk Jensen (born 15 January 1992) is a Danish professional footballer who plays as a midfielder for Copenhagen in the Danish Superliga.

Club career
Falk started his career at Middelfart G&BK and moved to Odense Boldklub (OB) alongside future Tottenham Hotspur and Inter Milan player, Christian Eriksen in 2005. He made his debut for OB in 2010 against AGF. Falk then signed a contract extension with OB, keeping him at the club until 30 June 2016.

Copenhagen
On 20 January 2016, Falk signed a pre-contract with Copenhagen, as he turned down a contract extension for OB, meaning that he could move as a free agent in the summer. On 1 July 2016, he officially moved to Copenhagen on a four-year contract.

Falk made his Copenhagen debut on 13 July 2016 and scored the final goal in the 3–0 Champions League qualification away win over Crusaders. In his first season at the club, he won the double; the Danish Superliga and Danish Cup.

On 5 August 2020, Falk scored the third goal in a 3–0 win over Turkish champions İstanbul Başakşehir to secure a spot in the quarter-finals of the Europa League.

International career 
On 29 August 2013, Falk was called up to play for the Denmark national football team. He played the first half of the 2-1 World Cup qualification win over Malta on 6 September 2013.

Career statistics

Club

Honours
Copenhagen
 Danish Superliga: 2016–17, 2018–19, 2021–22
 Danish Cup: 2016–17

External links
 OB profile

 Official Danish Superliga stats

References

1992 births
Living people
People from Middelfart Municipality
Sportspeople from the Region of Southern Denmark
Danish men's footballers
Association football midfielders
Denmark international footballers
Denmark under-21 international footballers
Denmark youth international footballers
Middelfart Boldklub players
Odense Boldklub players
F.C. Copenhagen players
Danish Superliga players